Howard Shoup (August 29, 1903 – May 29, 1987) was an American costume designer who received 5 Academy Award nominations.

He had over 170 film credits during his long career. Including films like Ocean's 11 and Cool Hand Luke.

Shoup was the long-term romantic partner of artist Sascha Brastoff.

Oscar Nominations
All 5 nominations were for Best Costumes-Black and White.

32nd Academy Awards-Nominated for The Young Philadelphians. Lost to Some Like It Hot.
33rd Academy Awards-Nominated for The Rise and Fall of Legs Diamond. Lost to The Facts of Life.
34th Academy Awards-Nominated for Claudelle Inglish. Lost to La Dolce Vita.
37th Academy Awards-Nominated for Kisses for My President. Lost to The Night of the Iguana.
38th Academy Awards-Nominated for A Rage to Live. Lost to Darling.

References

External links

1903 births
1976 deaths
American costume designers
People from Dallas
LGBT people from Texas
20th-century American LGBT people